Northgate Hospital is a mental health hospital located in Great Yarmouth, Norfolk, England . It is managed by Norfolk and Suffolk NHS Foundation Trust.

History
The hospital has its origins in the Great Yarmouth Union Workhouse designed by John Brown, the county surveyor, and established on the east side of Northgate Street in 1838.  Following a critical inspection in 1894, a new building was allocated for infirmary use. A new acute ward, which serves patients with mental illnesses in the Great Yarmouth area, was built in 2004.

See also
 List of hospitals in England

References

External links
Official site
 

NHS hospitals in England
Hospital buildings completed in 2004
Psychiatric hospitals in England
Hospitals in Norfolk
Great Yarmouth